The women's tournament of the 2013 World Senior Curling Championships was held at the Grant-Harvey Centre in Fredericton, New Brunswick from April 13 to 20.

Teams
The teams are listed as follows:

Pool A

Pool B

Round-robin standings
Final round-robin standings

Round-robin results
All draw times are listed in Atlantic Daylight Time (UTC−3).

Draw 3
Saturday, April 13, 16:00

Draw 4
Saturday, April 13, 19:00

Draw 5
Sunday, April 14, 8:30

Draw 6
Sunday, April 14, 12:00

Draw 9
Monday, April 15, 8:30

Draw 10
Monday, April 15, 12:00

Draw 11
Monday, April 15, 15:30

Draw 14
Tuesday, April 16, 12:00

Draw 15
Tuesday, April 16, 15:30

Draw 17
Wednesday, April 17, 8:30

Draw 18
Wednesday, April 17, 12:00

Draw 23
Thursday, April 18, 15:30

Draw 24
Thursday, April 18, 19:00

Draw 25
Friday, April 19, 8:30

Draw 26
Friday, April 19, 12:00

Tiebreaker
Friday, April 19, 19:00

Playoffs

Semifinals
Saturday, April 20, 8:00

Bronze medal game
Saturday, April 20, 14:00

Gold medal game
Saturday, April 20, 14:00

References

External links

2013 in Canadian curling
Curling competitions in Fredericton
2013 in New Brunswick